Washington Senators may refer to:

Politicians
 Members of the United States Senate, which convenes in Washington, D.C.
 United States senators from Washington, senators representing the state of Washington in the United States Senate
 Members of the Washington State Senate, which convenes in Olympia, Washington
 Senator Washington (disambiguation), senators with the surname Washington
 Shadow senator, an official symbolically elected to represent Washington, D.C., in the United States Senate

Sports

American football
 Washington Senators (NFL), an American football team that played from 1921 to 1922

Baseball
 Washington Senators (1891–1899), played in the American Association and the National League
 Washington Senators (1912), played in the short-lived United States Baseball League
 Washington Senators (1901–1960), an American League team, now the Minnesota Twins
 Washington Senators (1961–1971), an American League team, now the Texas Rangers
 Washington Nationals (disambiguation), other baseball teams based in Washington, D.C.

See also